The 4 × 400 metres relay at the 1983 World Championships in Athletics was held at the Helsinki Olympic Stadium on August 13 and August 14.

Medals

Records
Existing records at the start of the event.

Results

Heats
All times shown are in minutes.

Heat 1
 (Roberta Belle, Easter Gabriel, Rosalyn Bryant, Denean Howard) 3:26.82 Q
 (Charmaine Crooks, Jillian Richardson, Molly Killingbeck, Marita Payne) 3:27.21 Q
 (Milena Matějkovičová, Zuzana Moravčíková, Taťána Kocembová, Jarmila Kratochvílová) 3:27.60 Q
 (Rita Daimer, Ute Thimm, Gisela Gottwald, Gaby Bußmann) 3:29.70 q
 (Iulia Radu, Daniela Matei, Cristieana Cojocaru, Elena Lina) 3:30.96 q

Heat 2
 (Yelena Korban, Marina Ivanova, Irina Baskakova, Mariya Pinigina) 3:28.77 Q
 (Kerstin Walther, Undine Bremer, Ellen Fiedler, Sabine Busch) 3:29.05 Q
 (Svobodka Damyanova, Rositsa Stamenova, Katya Ilieva, Galina Penkova) 3:31.11 Q
 (Cathy Rattray, Ovrill Dwyer-Brown, Jacqueline Pusey, Grace Jackson) 3:34.17
 (Madeline De Jesus, Vilma Paris, Margaret De Jesus, Nilsa Paris) 3:42.79

Final
 (Kerstin Walther, Sabine Busch, Marita Koch, Dagmar Rübsam) 3:19.73
 (Taťána Kocembová, Milena Matějkovičová, Zuzana Moravčíková, Jarmila Kratochvílová) 3:20.32
 (Yelena Korban, Marina Ivanova, Irina Baskakova, Mariya Pinigina) 3:21.16
 (Charmaine Crooks, Jillian Richardson, Molly Killingbeck, Marita Payne) 3:27.41
 (Roberta Belle, Easter Gabriel, Rosalyn Bryant, Denean Howard) 3:27.57
 (Rita Daimer, Ute Thimm, Gisela Gottwald, Gaby Bußmann) 3:29.43
 (Svobodka Damyanova, Rositsa Stamenova, Katya Ilieva, Galina Penkova) 3:30.36
 (Iulia Radu, Daniela Matei, Cristieana Cojocaru, Elena Lina) 3:35.61

References
IAAF results, heats
IAAF results, final
 IAAF Statistics Book Moscow 2013 (pp. 299–300)

4 x 400 metres relay women
Relays at the World Athletics Championships
1983 in women's athletics